Fali is an unclassified Benue-Congo language of Nigeria, spoken in the town of Baissa in Taraba State.  The language is unwritten, and there are few to no speakers remaining.

Genetic affiliation
Baissa Fali belongs to the Benue–Congo sub-family of the Niger–Congo languages. Its position within this family remains a matter of discussion.

References

External links
  Fali of Baissa at Endangered Languages

Languages of Nigeria
Endangered Niger–Congo languages
Niger–Congo languages